William Scott Baker (born March 4, 1964) is an American political commentator and former television news anchor. He was an evening news anchor for thirteen years at WTAE-TV in Pittsburgh, Pennsylvania. Baker returned to WTAE in 2022 to host the midday newscast with Michelle Wright. He co-founded The Blaze, serving as editor-in-chief from 2010 to 2016. Scott Baker is the Chief Marketing Officer at CRA | Admired Leadership.

Education
Baker obtained his degree in political science from Wheaton College. While attending Wheaton College, he became interested in broadcasting while working on political campaigns. In 1984, Baker worked full-time for the Reagan-Bush campaign. He was the state president of the Illinois College Republicans.

Career
On August 31, 2010, Baker became managing editor of the online news and opinion website The Blaze. One of the site's co-founders, he was later appointed editor-in-chief. He left The Blaze in 2016. Previously, Baker worked for Voice of America (Washington, D.C.), CBS News (New York City), and at television stations in Erie, Pennsylvania, and Saginaw, Michigan, before becoming an evening news anchor for thirteen years at WTAE-TV in Pittsburgh, Pennsylvania.

For fifteen years, Baker taught a two-day seminar on broadcast journalism at the Leadership Institute in Arlington, Virginia.

Personal life
In 2003, Baker married Miss America 1999 Nicole Johnson. The couple met in the mid-90s at a seminar Baker held for college students interested in news careers. Johnson and Baker later divorced in 2008. He resides in Pittsburgh, Pennsylvania.

See also 
 GBTV
 Glenn Beck

References

External links

 The Quiet Co-Founder of the Media Juggernaut No One Writes About

American male bloggers
American bloggers
American male journalists
American political commentators
American political writers
Living people
Wheaton College (Illinois) alumni
Online journalists
Blaze Media people
American television news anchors
American activists
American alternative journalists
Writers from Pittsburgh
Pittsburgh television reporters
1964 births
Journalists from Pennsylvania
20th-century American journalists
Voice of America people
CBS News people
21st-century American non-fiction writers
Illinois Republicans
Pennsylvania Republicans